Mahmoudiyeh F.C. is the first football team that was established in Afghanistan. The club was founded in 1934. In 1937, the team travelled to British India where it played 18 matches against Indian teams of which won 8, lost 9 and drew 1.

The club produced many notable players of whom, four took part in 1948 Olympic Games as members of the Afghanistan national football team: Wahid Aitimadi, Abdul Ahad Kharot,
Abdul Ghafoor Assar and Abdul Ghani Assar.

References

Football clubs in Afghanistan
Sport in Kabul
Association football clubs established in 1934
1934 establishments in Afghanistan